Cercospora halstedii is a fungal plant pathogen.

References

External links

halstedii
Fungal plant pathogens and diseases